The Embassy of Austria in Washington, D.C. is the primary diplomatic mission of the Republic of Austria to the United States and represent the interests of Austria and Austrian citizens in the U.S. It is located  at 3524 International Court, NW, Washington, D.C., in a neighborhood primarily occupied by diplomatic missions. Its immediate neighbors are the Embassy of Slovakia, the Embassy of the United Arab Emirates, and the Embassy of Egypt. The chancery building houses and operates several services and offices relevant to the pursuit of its mission in the United States; they are listed below.

The Ambassador of Austria to the United States is Dr. Petra Schneebauer, who took office in March 2023.

Austria's former embassy on Massachusetts Avenue was sold in 1993, and is now the embassy of Croatia.

Services
The chancery building is home to the ambassador's office, the consular section as well as the embassy's economic and political departments.

In addition, the following offices are located within the building:

Austrian Press & Information Service in the United States

The Austrian Press & Information Service acts as the embassy's press and public diplomacy office. Founded in 1948 as part of the Austrian Consulate General in New York City, the service moved and integrated its offices into the Austrian Embassy in Washington, D.C. in 1992. It publishes a quarterly zine, Austrian Information, in printed and electronic format, as well as "Jewish News from Austria", a translation of Austrian media reports on Jewish life in Austria, in electronic format. In addition, the Service publishes a monthly, electronic newsletter, the "Austrian Dispatch". It is responsible for the Embassy's web sites "Taste of Austria", "Culture Space"  and "Project 175"  and social media accounts: Facebook, Pinterest, Twitter.

Austrian Cultural Forum Washington
The Austrian Cultural Forum Washington, D.C. is one of Austria’s two cultural representation offices in the United States (the other is in New York City). It was created with the objective of serving as a focus of cultural exchange between Austrians/Europeans and Americans. It is an agency of the Austrian Federal Ministry for Europe, Integration and Foreign Affairs and is integrated into the Austrian Embassy in Washington, D.C.

Its objectives are:
 Presenting contemporary, innovative artistic and scientific achievements in a broad range of discipline;
 Providing a platform for presentations of emerging artists who have their life and career centered in Austria;
 Creating interfaces and promoting interaction between Austrian/European and American cultural institutions and artists;
 Acting as a forum for dialogue and discourse on relevant issues in culture and politics;
 Promoting and highlighting cultural and scientific contributions from or about Austria.

The Austrian Cultural Forum organizes and supports a variety of cultural events (concerts, film screenings, exhibitions, theatre, lectures, panel discussions, symposia), most of which take place in the Atrium of the Austrian Embassy. Most events at the Embassy are open to the public and free of charge.

Office of Science and Technology Austria

The Office of Science & Technology (OSTA) at the Embassy of Austria in Washington, D.C., acts as a strategic interface in the areas of higher education, science, research, and innovation policy between Austria and North America. It provides information on S&T and higher education trends and policy in Austria, Europe, and North America with its online magazine bridges. It also promotes transatlantic cooperation through support and advice on initiating R&D cooperation between institutions in Austria and North America. It supports and connects Austrian scientists in North America through the Research and Innovation Network Austria.

Commercial Section of the Austrian Embassy
The commercial section of the embassy is not housed in the chancery building, but located at 818 18th Street, NW, Suite 500, in Washington, D.C., 20006. Its tasks include:
 business development for Austrian companies vis-a-vis the International Financial Institutions
 trade policy issues between Austria and the USA
 public procurement, particularly in the military and homeland security sectors
 export control issues and US sanctions' policies,
 cooperation with interest groups, associations, and chambers in Washington, D.C.

Consulates
There are two Austrian consulates-general in the United States located in New York City and Los Angeles. There are also a number of honorary consulates in Anchorage, Alaska, Atlanta, Georgia, Boston, MA, Chicago, Illinois, Cincinnati, OH, Columbus, Ohio, Detroit, MI, Fort Myers, FL, Honolulu, HI, Houston, TX, Kansas City, MO, Las Vegas, NV, Miami, Florida, Nassau, New Orleans, LA, Orlando, FL, Philadelphia, PA, Pittsburgh, PA, Portland, OR, Richmond, VA, Spartanburg, SC, St. Louis, Missouri, Saint Paul, Minnesota, St. Thomas, U.S. Virgin Islands, Salt Lake City, Utah, San Francisco, CA, San Juan, PR, and Scottsdale, Arizona.

See also
 Austrian Ambassador to the United States
 Austria–United States relations

References

External links

 Austrian Embassy - Washington, D.C.
 Austrian Consulate General New York
 Austrian Consulate General Los Angeles
 Austrian Cultural Forum Washington, D.C.
 Austrian Cultural Forum New York

Austria
Washington, D.C.
Austria–United States relations
North Cleveland Park